The use of shackles or restraints on pregnant women is a common practice in prisons and jails in the United States. Shackling is defined as "using any physical restraint or mechanical device to control the movement of a prisoner's body or limbs, including handcuffs, leg shackles, and belly chains". For females, shackles or handcuffs are placed around the ankles, wrists, or around the stomach. The shackling of pregnant women occurs while they are transported within a facility, transported to a hospital, and/or during and after childbirth. Restraints are also used on detained pregnant women in immigration detention facilities.

Pregnant women and babies under correctional custody have unique healthcare needs. These needs are often not addressed by most custody policies, which may put these women and babies at risk. In custody, there is a typical lack of routine prenatal care and adequate nutrition. There is also a risk of experiencing physical and emotional abuse, mental health issues, and untreated sexually transmitted infections.

Background

There continues to be a disproportionately higher percentage of males than females incarcerated across the United States. In 2009, the U.S. Bureau of Justice Statistics found the correctional population in the United States to be 8.7% women or 198,600 of the 2,292,133 incarcerated persons. Male inmates in general also have more violent criminal histories and are more likely to be serving time for violent offenses than their female counterparts. The Bureau of Justice Statistics reported, "Women are substantially more likely than men to be serving time for a drug offense and less likely to have been sentenced for a violent crime." Accordingly, men are twice as likely as women to be violent recidivists, while women account for only fourteen percent of violent offenses and three of four violent female offenders commit simple assault.

Due to the disproportionately higher incarceration rates of violent male offenders to female offenders, many across the international rights community agree prisons have predominantly been designed to control male inmates, particularly those who are violent. For these reasons, there is much controversy surrounding the use of shackles on women in general, and pregnant women in particular. Adding to the controversy is the issue of race. Since there is a disproportionately higher rate of women of color incarcerated across the United States, a greater number of African-American and Hispanic women are disproportionately affected.

Pregnant inmates
According to the Bureau of Justice Assistance (BJA), "Four percent of state and three percent of federal inmates said they were pregnant at the time of admission." Upon intake the BJA also found that "five percent of women in jails reported being pregnant". Meanwhile, there are no concrete statistics on the number of pregnant girls (younger than age 18) in juvenile justice facilities, where pregnancy statistics are not tracked.

Opposing viewpoints

There are three primary justifications used to support the use of restraint on pregnant women. First, restraints prevent inmates from bringing harm to themselves and others; second, restraints prevent the escape or attempt to escape of pregnant women; and third, restraints are meant to maintain security in general. Moreover, these justifications are identical to those used to support the use of restraints on male and female inmates in general population across various state and federal facilities. Correctional department officials also cite their responsibility or burden to balance the health and safety of the inmate with that of the public in further support of the use of restraints on pregnant women.

Opponents of the practice offer several counterarguments to the justifications presented above. They argue foremost the use of restraints on pregnant women raises important human rights concerns and increases the health risks to the woman and her child. Many in the international community are quick to point out pregnant women are lower security threats to themselves and others than men. In particular, the International Human Rights Clinic, CLAIM, and the American Civil Liberties Union (ACLU) filed a joint report stating, "Women who are pregnant, in labor, or in postpartum recovery are especially low flight and safety risks." In support of this point of view, Geraldine Doetzer in "Hard Labor" states that pregnant women who are in active labor "are physically much less able to mount an attack or escape attempt."

Health risks and concerns

A number of health concerns have been raised by the American College of Obstetricians and Gynecologists (ACOG), the American Public Health Association, the American Medical Association and others surrounding the use of shackles on pregnant women. These concerns involve various increased health risks to the woman and her child, which arise at different points of shackling. While pregnant during incarceration, shackles can increase the risk of falling where a woman's center of gravity is shifted by the pregnant uterus. For example, restraints placed on a woman's wrists also prevent her from breaking a fall and protecting herself and her abdomen. In regards to sickness and treatment, the use of shackles complicates the assessment of physical and other medical conditions before and during the process of childbirth. This includes diagnostic tests to determine the source of abdominal pains and nausea, hypertensive diseases—which occur in 12–22% of pregnancies—and of vaginal bleeding. All of these pose severe threats to the health of the mother and the fetus.

Restraints can also interfere with normal labor and delivery of the child. It can be important for women to be able to ambulate during labor to alleviate pain and be able to be moved quickly in case a Caesarean section becomes necessary. Problems such as complications from hemorrhages, a decrease in fetal heart tones, or preeclampsia often necessitate an emergency C-section. For these reasons, the American Public Health Association, warns "[w]omen must never be shackled during labor and delivery".

Following childbirth, restraints can interfere with the mother's ability to safely handle their infant, and interfere in creating a close bond. The restriction in mobility from restraints can place the woman at increased risk for contracting the thromboembolic disease and getting a postpartum hemorrhage.

Policy perspectives

State and local

States in the US have moved toward eliminating or greatly reducing the use of restraints on pregnant women in their facilities. California, Illinois, and New York have passed statewide legislation to completely eliminate the practice and a total of 24 states have adopted policies limiting the use of restraints on pregnant prisoners. A number of states allow for the unrestricted use of restraints on pregnant women. Of the states that have passed restrictions of some sort, 18 still include broad exceptions.  More broadly speaking, 48 states lack legislation that lays out specific protections for incarcerated pregnant women.

In 2014, the Bureau of Justice Assistance (BJA) under the U.S. Department of Justice released a report entitled "Best Practices in the Use of Restraints with Pregnant Women and Girls under Correctional Custody". It was created by the National Task Force on the Use of Restraints with Pregnant Women under Correctional Custody to guide and assist institutions and jurisdictions in "the development of local policy and practice". The report outlines five key principles on which the Task Force reached a consensus, and 11 recommendations concerning the use of restraints on pregnant women. The five principles discuss the importance of written policies and procedures on the use of restraints during custody and transport, who should be writing these policies, the unique healthcare needs and circumstance of pregnant women and girls, the related health risks posed by restraints, and the limitation on the use of restraints to "absolute necessity". The 11  recommendations outline specific cases in which the use of restraints should be prohibited, avoided and/or limited, as well as what facility standard operating procedures should include regarding the use of restraints on pregnant women. ACOG standards specifically state that the use of restraints on pregnant incarcerated women and adolescents compromises health care and is inhumane. Georgia, South Carolina, Kentucky, Mississippi, Missouri, Nebraska, North Dakota, South Dakota, Wyoming and Alabama have no policies. Many other states have policies about providing healthcare for pregnant inmates, but do not mention anything about restraining or shackling them.

Massachusetts
In April 2014, Massachusetts passed an act allowing for the use of restraints in "extraordinary circumstances". Such "extraordinary circumstances" include anytime a corrections officer deems it necessary that restraints be used to prevent a pregnant inmate from escaping or from causing self-injury or injuring medical or correctional personnel.

Pennsylvania
In Pennsylvania, pregnant prisoners can be shackled and handcuffed during the delivery of the child. In fact, the state reported that over 100 pregnant women were shackled during a year-long period between July 2012 to June 2013.

California
In January 2006, California passed legislation stating that a pregnant "inmate shall not be shackled by the wrists, ankles, or both during labor, including during transport to a hospital, during delivery, and while in recovery after giving birth."

Maryland
Maryland's policy states they limit the use of restraints, but it does not say anything about the use of shackles or restraints on pregnant, incarcerated women.

Florida
Florida prohibits use of restraints on pregnant prisoners at all times during labor, delivery, and postpartum recovery unless a corrections official makes an individualized determination that the prisoner presents an extraordinary circumstance requiring restraints.

West Virginia
West Virginia law states that pregnant inmates will not be restrained after reaching the second trimester of pregnancy until the end of the pregnancy, unless she poses a threat of escape or safety of herself, the public, staff, or the fetus. Then the inmate may be restrained, but she will also consult with an appropriate health care professional to assure that the manner of restraint will not pose an unreasonable risk of harm to the inmate or the fetus.

Rhode Island
Rhode Island's policy states that pregnant inmates cannot be restrained in their second or third trimester unless deemed medically appropriate.

Hawaii
Hawaii law states that no restraints may be used on any committed female from the third trimester of her pregnancy through postpartum recovery or during any portion of her pregnancy if her physician so orders, except in extraordinary circumstances.

Idaho
Idaho law states that a correctional institution cannot use restraints on a prisoner known to be pregnant during labor and delivery, except in an extraordinary circumstance where a corrections official makes an individualized determination that restraints are necessary to prevent a prisoner from escaping or injuring herself.

Washington
In Washington, the use of restraints on pregnant women or youth in custody is allowed only in extraordinary circumstances.

Federal

In 2008 the Federal Bureau of Prisons mandated that in all federal correctional facilities, "inmates in labor, delivery, or post-delivery recuperations shall not be placed in restraints unless there are reasonable grounds to believe the inmate presents an immediate serious threat of hurting herself or others, or there are reasonable grounds to believe the inmate presents an immediate and credible risk of escape." In April 2008, President George W. Bush signed the Second Chance Act into law, requiring all federal facilities to document and report "the use of physical restraints on pregnant female prisoners during pregnancy, labor, delivery, and post-delivery and justify the use of restraints with documented security concerns". This shift in federal policy, limiting and reporting the use of restraints on pregnant women parallels the policy changes being made at the state and local levels mentioned above.

The FIRST STEP Act prohibits the use of restraints on pregnant women, unless the woman "is an immediate and credible flight risk that cannot reasonably be prevented by other means" or "poses an immediate and serious threat of harm to herself or others that cannot reasonably be prevented by other means" or "a healthcare professional responsible for the health and safety of the prisoner determines that the use of restraints is appropriate for the medical safety of the prisoner." For those situations in which restraints are allowed, the legislation mandates the use of the least restrictive restraints necessary.

International

The use of shackles on pregnant women by correctional facilities in the United States has been widely criticized by the international community. The following have been cited as international policies which this practice violates: Articles 7 and 10 of the International Covenant on Civil and Political Rights (ICCPR) Article 16 of the Convention Against Torture (CAT), and the United Nations Standard Minimum Rules for the Treatment of Prisoners. In response to reports presented by Amnesty International, the United Nations Human Rights Committee recommended to the United States in 2006 to "prohibit the shackling of detained women during childbirth" to come into compliance with the aforementioned international treaties. Many state and federal level policies enacted to eliminate or reduce the use of shackles on pregnant women have served as a response to these recommendations and statements issued by the United Nations. They proposed that the U.S.:1) enact a federal law banning the practice of shackling prisoners during pregnancy, covering, at a minimum, the third trimester, transport to medical facilities, labor, delivery and postpartum recovery, 2) take appropriate measures to ensure that those 32 states that do not have anti-shackling laws to enact comprehensive laws, including training of correctional officers, 3) to review existing state anti- shackling laws and policies to ensure that they are comprehensive and fully implemented, and 4) to conduct an empirical study to determine the scope of shackling in U.S. prisons and to understand why the practice of shackling pregnant women persists.British law states that pregnant women will no longer wear restraints within hospitals unless they are considered to be high security risks. They will be allowed to have antenatal visits at the prison where there will be at least one accompanying woman.

Legal perspectives
On the legal front, the use of restraints on pregnant women has been repeatedly challenged for violating the Eighth Amendment of the United States Constitution, which prohibits "cruel and unusual punishment". In a recent landmark decision, the United States Court of Appeals for the Eighth Circuit supported this claim in the case, Nelson v. Correctional Medical Services. The Court held that the Arkansas law "'clearly established' that shackling a woman prisoner during labor and delivery violated the Eighth Amendment, imposing cruel and unusual punishment." In their Judicial Opinion the Court cited Estelle v. Gamble, in which the Supreme Court held "deliberate indifference" to provide medical care to incarcerated populations violated the Eighth Amendment based on the government's obligation to abide by "an evolving standard of human decency".

References

Imprisonment and detention of women in the United States
Legal issues in pregnancy
Physical restraint